The annual fuel utilization efficiency (AFUE; pronounced 'A'-'Few' or 'A'-'F'-'U'-'E') is a thermal efficiency measure of space-heating  furnaces and boilers. The AFUE differs from the true 'thermal efficiency' in that it is not a steady-state, peak measure of conversion efficiency, but instead attempts to represent the actual, season-long, average efficiency of that piece of equipment, including the operating transients. It is a dimensionless ratio of useful energy output to energy input, expressed as a percentage. For example, a 90% AFUE for a gas furnace means it outputs 90 BTUs of useful heating for every 100 BTUs of natural gas input (where the rest may be wasted heat in the exhaust). A higher AFUE means higher efficiency.

The method for determining the AFUE for residential furnaces and boilers is the subject of ASHRAE Standard 103. A furnace with a thermal efficiency (ηth) of 78% may yield an AFUE of only 64% or so, for example, under the standard's test conditions. When estimating annual or seasonal energy used by combustion devices, the AFUE is the better efficiency measure to use in the calculations. But for an instantaneous fuel consumption rate, the thermal efficiency may be better.

Note that the theoretical limit for a conventional furnace's instantaneous efficiency is 100%, whereas a heat pump used for building heating may exceed 100%. For example, a COP of 1.5 is equivalent to 150%. Heat pumps are readily available for electric and gas sources. So from a theoretical perspective, in some use cases the name "efficiency" may be misleading.

See also
Coefficient of performance (COP)
Energy efficiency ratio (EER)
Seasonal energy efficiency ratio (SEER)
ASHRAE
Air-Conditioning, Heating, and Refrigeration Institute (AHRI)

References

Heating, ventilation, and air conditioning